According to WHO's 2016 suicide report, Spain ranked 130th of the 170 countries listed. Spain had an overall suicide rate of 6.1 per 100,000 people, less than most other countries in Europe (e.g. Sweden 11.7/100.000; France 12.3/100.000; Germany 9.1/100.000; UK 7.6/100.000) The reason behind this is unknown; among the many reasons put forward it has been argued that Southern European Mediterranean countries are less prone to suicide for cultural reasons, such as ease of socialisation, deeper religious beliefs that consider suicide as a sin, or just favourable weather conditions rendering less likely seasonal depression. This is consistent with the fact that other southern European countries such as Italy, Greece or Portugal, share a similar low suicidal rate as compared with northern countries. However, exceptions exist since Hungary, a relatively southern country, ranks high in suicidal rates (13.6/100.000, see ref above).

As in most other countries, Spanish men commit suicide more frequently than Spanish women (3 times more). Also, the influence of cold weather and/or lower sun exposure as a causal factor may be contradicted by data showing higher incidence of suicides during spring and summer.

A particular case: "Suicides for eviction". suicides for eviction in Spain refers to the suicide of Spanish citizens as a direct or indirect consequence of an eviction or foreclosure for non-payment of the mortgage or rent, which results in the eviction of the homeowner or tenant, often with family members, from the home they may have lived in for years, whether the home was purchased through a mortgage or rented. According to statistics from the first quarter of 2012, each day 517 evictions took place in Spain; there were 101,034 evictions in total in 2012. Suicides for eviction have become endemic in Spain, and are a problem associated with the consequences of the economic crisis and problems with the mortgage laws.

According to data from the organization Stop Desahucios, part of the Platform of People Affected from Mortgage, 34% of the suicides in Spain result from evictions. Suicide is the main cause of violent death in Spain, causing more deaths than road accidents. In 2010, 3,145 persons committed suicide in Spain.

Sometimes the link between eviction and suicide is not apparent, and as in most suicides, is due to complex and difficult personal situations. Also some suicides related to eviction are not known about, or publicized in the press, making it difficult to establish reliable statistics as the National Institute of Statistics cannot analyze these data.

Economic and legal causes

Spanish mortgage law 
The current Spanish mortgage law is a decree of 8 February 1946, to which there have been more recent modifications.

Social and economic exclusion
The specific 2008–2014 Spanish financial crisis was caused largely by the housing bubble in Spain, and the subsequent Spanish real-estate crisis has dramatically increased the number of foreclosures and evictions. According to figures from the Mortgage Affected Platform, there have been more than 400,000 evictions since the start of the crisis in 2007. The housing bubble, along with the increase in unemployment in Spain to 25%, together with cuts in payments to the unemployed and other forms of social assistance have left many sectors of the population excluded from both public and private economic circuits.

Proposals from platforms in defense of evicted people
The Platform of People Affected from Mortgage and other associations which defend those subject to forced eviction have proposed legal modifications which would mitigate the vulnerability of those affected, including payment in kind, which is not permitted in Spain.

See also
List of countries by suicide rate

References